Shaun Want (born 9 February 1997) is a Scottish professional footballer who plays as a defender for NIFL Premiership side Larne.

Career
In June 2019 he signed a contract extension with the Accies, running until summer 2020.

On 3 August 2020, Want signed a new three-year deal at Hamilton keeping him at the club until 2023. Having been a back-up squad player for much of his early career, at that time he stated that he hoped to play more in the coming season and was happy to fill in wherever needed; however, his campaign was ended by injury in October 2020 and the club was relegated from the Scottish Premiership at its end. On the opening matchday of the following season, Want scored a late equaliser as Hamilton came back from four goals down to earn a draw against Raith Rovers in the 2021–22 Scottish Championship. A few weeks later he suffered facial injuries after a clash of heads with a teammate during a Scottish Challenge Cup tie. 

He moved on loan to Peterhead in February 2022.

In July 2022 he spoke about Hamilton's use of young players.

Want left Hamilton by mutual consent in August 2022, in order to sign for Northern Irish club Larne.

Career statistics

Honours
County Antrim Shield: 2022-23

References

1997 births
Living people
Scottish footballers
Sportspeople from Rutherglen
Footballers from Glasgow
Hamilton Academical F.C. players
Peterhead F.C. players
Larne F.C. players
Scottish Professional Football League players
Association football defenders
Footballers from South Lanarkshire